Metka Sparavec (born December 9, 1978 in Maribor) is a retired female freestyle and backstroke swimmer from Slovenia. She represented her native country at the 1996 Summer Olympics in Atlanta, Georgia, where she did not reach the final in either of her two individual starts (50 m and 100 m freestyle).

Sparavec was named Slovenian Sportswoman of the year in 1999, after having claimed the bronze medal in the women's 50 m backstroke event at the 1999 European LC Championships in Istanbul.

References

External links
 
 
 

1978 births
Living people
Female backstroke swimmers
Slovenian female freestyle swimmers
Slovenian female swimmers
Olympic swimmers of Slovenia
Swimmers at the 1996 Summer Olympics
Sportspeople from Maribor
European Aquatics Championships medalists in swimming